Adaptive equipment are devices that are used to assist bathing, dressing, grooming, toileting, and feeding are self-care activities that are including in the spectrum of activities of daily living (ADLs). Jennifer McLaughlin Maly a P.T./ D.P.T. in her article located in the journal Exceptional Parent gives a more complete definition of adaptive equipment: 

A growing market for adaptive equipment is in the use of mobility vans. In this case, adaptive equipment, also known as assistive technology, can help a person with a disability operate a motor vehicle when otherwise they would not be able to.

Mobility assistance 
Mobility adaptive equipment are used in cases where a disease or accident leaves an individual's motor functions hindered or unusable. if an individual has restricted motor functions, there are equipment and technology that can assist in regaining some or all mobility.

Types of Mobility Adaptive Equipment

Wheelchair 
A manual or motorized wheelchair is a chair with attached wheels that allow a person who cannot walk, due to illness, injury, or disability, to move around.

Crutches 
Crutches are devices used to transfer the bodies load from the lower body to the upper body. Crutches are used when one's lower body is not completely immobilized, but impaired.

Prosthetic devices 
Prosthetic devices are artificial devices used to replace a missing body part caused from either an illness, accident, or a birth defect.

Orthotic devices
Orthotic devices, or orthoses, are devices used to align, brace, or correct deformities. Orthoses also help to improve the movement of one's joints, spine, or limbs.

Sensory assistance 
Sensory/Neurological adaptive equipment are used in cases where an individual lacks proper stimulation of a sense. For instance, individuals who are either blind, mute, deaf, or a combination of them.

Types of Sensory Adaptive Equipment

Hearing aids 
Hearing aids are devices used by partially deaf individual to regain a portion of hearing by amplifying sound.

Braille 
Braille is a system a raised bumps that allow blind individuals to read text with their fingers. Braille is a code of language and not a language in itself.

Assistive listening devices (ALD) 
Assistive listening devices (ALD) are devices used to amplify sounds an individual wants to hear, especially in areas with much background noise. ADLs can be used with hearing aids and cochlear implants to improve the individuals hearing.

Augmentative and Alternative Communication (AAC) devices 
Augmentative and Alternative Communication (AAC) devices are used to help individuals with communication disorder to express themselves to others. The devices can carry from picture boards to computer assisted speech.

Alerting devices 
Alerting devices are assistive devices that connect with doorbells, telephones, and other alarming devices. These devices add a specific alarm based on one's disability. For instance, a deaf individual can have a doorbell that blinks a light instead of a noise to indicate someone is at the door.

References

Tools
Assistive technology